Antaeotricha griseanomina is a moth in the family Depressariidae. It was described by August Busck in 1934. It is found in the Guianas.

References

Moths described in 1934
griseanomina
Moths of South America